Tall Al-Magass is an archaeological site during the Chalcolithic period that lies north of modern-day Aqaba city in Jordan. Tall Al-Magass and the neighboring Tall Hujayrat Al-Ghuzlan site, also north of Aqaba, both have extensive evidence of significant copper production and trade in the region.

References

External Links
Photos of Maqass at the American Center of Research

Archaeological sites in Jordan
Former populated places in Jordan